Lou Bennett  is an Indigenous Australian musician, actor and academic researching Aboriginal languages and their retrieval.

Early life and education
Bennett is a Yorta Yorta/Dja Dja Wurrung woman from Echuca, Victoria, Australia.

In October 2015 Bennett completed a PhD on Aboriginal language retrieval and reclamation at RMIT University. Her thesis was entitled "Sovereign Language Repatriation".

Career
Bennett started her musical career with her uncle's band "The Shades", before later joining Richard Frankland's band "Djaambi", where she met Sally Dastey and Amy Saunders—Bennett, Dastey and Saunders later formed the Australian Recording Industry Association (ARIA) Award-winning band Tiddas.

After Tiddas disbanded in 2000, Bennett performed with a new band Sweet Cheeks and has worked as a stage actor—the latter has included an autobiographical show Show Us Your Tiddas!. Show Us Your Tiddas! follows Bennett's life as she recounts a series of stories that include the occasion when she revealed her sexuality to her family, her first live performance, moving into an urban environment and her time with Tiddas.

Bennett was a member of The Black Arm Band, for which she was an artistic director, composer, vocal supervisor and performer. This included directing, arranging, and performing in Dirtsong, both the world premiere at the 2009 Melbourne International Arts Festival and the second performance at  the 2014 Adelaide Festival. The songs were written by Alexis Wright, with some in Aboriginal languages.

Bennett also contributed vocals to the 2012 Australian film The Sapphires, following her involvement with the 2004 Melbourne stage production.

Honours and recognition 
In 2017, Bennett was inducted onto the Victorian Honour Roll of Women. She was invited by the University of New England to give the 2018 Frank Archibald Memorial Lecture.

Her "significant service to the performing arts, particularly to music, and to the Indigenous community" was recognised by the award of Member of the Order of Australia (AM) in the 2019 Australia Day Honours.

Theatre projects
Magpie (2000) – Melbourne Workers Theatre 
Conversations with the Dead (2001) – Ilbijerri Theatre, Playbox, La Mama 
Yanagai! Yanagai! (2003) – Melbourne Workers Theatre, Playbox 
The Sapphires (2004) – Melbourne Theatre Company 
Show Us Your Tiddas! (2007) – Melbourne Workers Theatre
Our Home Our Land (2011) – Boites 2009 Millennium Chorus

References

External links
black arm band
University of Melbourne profile

Living people
20th-century LGBT people
21st-century LGBT people
Australian women singer-songwriters
Australian musical theatre actresses
Australian women guitarists
Indigenous Australian actresses
Indigenous Australian musicians
Lesbian singers
Australian LGBT singers
Australian LGBT songwriters
Lesbian songwriters
Australian lesbian musicians
Indigenous Australian linguists
Members of the Order of Australia
Musicians from Victoria (Australia)
People from Echuca
RMIT University alumni
Academic staff of the University of Melbourne
University of Melbourne women
Women linguists
Year of birth missing (living people)
Linguists of Yotayotic languages
Linguists of Kulinic languages